Giorgio Oberweger (22 December 1913 – 14 October 1998) was an Italian discus thrower who won a bronze medal at the 1936 Olympics and a silver at the 1938 European Champsionships. He placed sixth at the 1934 European Championships and 15th at the 1948 Olympics. Oberweger won five national titles, in the discus throw (1934 and 1936–1938) and 110 metres hurdles (1939).

Biography
Oberweger graduated in law from the University of Bologna, but later favored engineering related occupations. In 1938 he obtained a pilot license, and fought as a fighter pilot during World War II, receiving three medals for bravery. Between 1946 and 1960 he was head coach of the Italian athletics team. Then until 1967 he worked at the Italian Athletics Federation and until 1972 at the Italian Central School of Sport.

References

External links
 

1913 births
1998 deaths
Italian male discus throwers
Italian male hurdlers
Olympic bronze medalists for Italy
Athletes (track and field) at the 1936 Summer Olympics
Athletes (track and field) at the 1948 Summer Olympics
Olympic athletes of Italy
Sportspeople from Trieste
People from Austrian Littoral
Italian people of Austrian descent
European Athletics Championships medalists
Medalists at the 1936 Summer Olympics
Olympic bronze medalists in athletics (track and field)
20th-century Italian people